Kenny Wayne Hollingsworth is an American guitarist and entrepreneur. He is best known as guitarist on the Leon Bridges' Grammy-nominated debut album, Coming Home.

He played with and is a founding member of the North Texas indie band The Orbans. Which released their debut album When We Were Wild in 2010.

Kenny launched Songbird Music, a creative music agency, in 2017, with lifelong friends Taylor Potts and Will Hobbs.
A native Texan, Kenny grew up in the small town of Whitt, Texas. He now lives in Fort Worth, Texas when he is not out on the road touring.

References 

Date of birth missing (living people)
Living people
American rock guitarists
People from Fort Worth, Texas
Year of birth missing (living people)